VSFS may refer to:

Victoria's Secret Fashion Show, a defunct fashion show sponsored by Victoria's Secret
Virtual Student Foreign Service, U.S. Department of State program